Nicolae Spîrcu (born 6 December 1969) is a Romanian rower. He competed at the 1992 Summer Olympics and the 1996 Summer Olympics.

References

1969 births
Living people
Romanian male rowers
Olympic rowers of Romania
Rowers at the 1992 Summer Olympics
Rowers at the 1996 Summer Olympics
People from Olt County